The Marxist Coordination Committee (MCC, abbreviated मासस 'maasas') is a political party in Jharkhand, India. MCC is based in the coal mining region of Dhanbad.

Originally founded as Janwadi Kisan Sangram Samiti was formed in 1971 after local communist leader A. K. Roy had been expelled from the Communist Party of India (Marxist). JKSS was later renamed to the MCC. The party is still led by Roy, who has been elected MP three times.

Roy was active in the Jharkhand movement and helped develop the organisation which would later become Jharkhand Mukti Morcha. As Jharkhand Mukti Morcha developed into a political party, the relations between the two soured.

In 1980, A. K. Roy (then an MP) and K.S. Chatterjee, a member of the Bihar Legislative Assembly, were arrested under the National Security Act. In total, Roy has been jailed four times.

Chatterjee had been elected to the Bihar Legislative Assembly twice as an Independent candidate. He joined the Indian National Congress and won in 1985 on a Congress ticket. He is a prominent trade union leader in the Dhanbad region and is the President of Bihar Pradesh Colliery Mazdoor Congress.

In 1998, the only member of the Bihar Legislative Assembly representing the MCC, Gurudas Chatterjee, was murdered by the coal mafia. Chatterjee's son, Arup Chatterjee, took over his mandate after a by-poll.

Marxist Co-ordination Committee always maintain good relation with CPIML(L) from the beginning.

External links 
 The Hindu, Candidate Watch : A.K. Roy
 PTI: CBI to probe Bihar MLA's killing
 https://web.archive.org/web/20131112081644/http://dhanbad.nic.in/election.html
 http://empoweringindia.com/new/knowyourcandidates.aspx?eid=166
 http://www.empoweringindia.org/new/preview.aspx?candid=254498&cid=283

 
Political parties in Jharkhand
Communist parties in India
Communist Party of India (Marxist) breakaway groups
Political parties established in 1971
1971 establishments in Bihar